Bityla is a genus of moths of the family Noctuidae.

Selected species
Bityla defigurata Butler, 1865
Bityla sericea Butler, 1877

References

Natural History Museum Lepidoptera genus database

Hadeninae